Standard Fireworks is a former British-based firework company, now a brand name of Chinese firm Black Cat Fireworks.

History
Standard's history began in 1891, when it was founded by James Greenhalgh in Huddersfield. Due to expansion, in 1910 the firm moved to its current site in Crosland Hill where, during the First and Second World Wars, the company produced munitions for the war effort.

In 1959 the company was floated on the Stock Market and a period of domination in the UK fireworks industry began, with many retailers having to wait several years for an account with the company. In 1988 Standard bought Brocks Fireworks Ltd.  This led to all firework activity being transferred to the Huddersfield site making Standard one of the largest employers in the Yorkshire region, with over 500 workers.

In 1998 Standard went into receivership. They were purchased by China-based Black Cat Fireworks, bringing an end to production in the UK. The Standard brand is now one of several trading names of Black Cat in the UK, with the former Standard offices now the UK headquarters for this operation.

A box of Standard Fireworks was at the centre of a story that comedian Bob Mortimer told on the TV show Would I Lie To You?

References

External links
 

British brands
English brands
Fireworks companies
Companies based in Huddersfield
1891 establishments in England
Chemical companies established in 1891
Manufacturing companies of the United Kingdom
British companies established in 1891
Companies disestablished in 1998
1998 disestablishments in England